Adam Guy Gunthorpe (born 29 October 1983 in Australia) is a former first-class cricketer active 2005 who played in two matches for Hong Kong as a right-handed batsman.

References

1983 births
Living people
Place of birth missing (living people)
Hong Kong cricketers
21st-century Hong Kong people